Owasso Independent School District v. Falvo, 534 U.S. 426 (2002), was a case in which the United States Supreme Court held in favor of Owasso Independent School District that students scoring each other's tests and calling out the grades do not violate the Family Educational Rights and Privacy Act of 1974 (FERPA). Justice Kennedy wrote the opinion of the court. Justice Scalia wrote a concurring opinion in which he agreed with the ruling but took issue with parts of Kennedy's opinion. The case originated in the District Court of and for Tulsa County, Oklahoma, where the court ruled in Owasso's favor. Falvo appealed to the United States District Court for the Northern District of Oklahoma, where they overturned the district judge's decision and ruled in favor of Falvo. It was then appealed to the United States Court of Appeals for the 10th Circuit, where they partially reversed the lower court's judgment and partially affirmed it. They affirmed in regards to the 14th Amendment complaint, but reversed on the FERPA claim, stating that the peer grading act did violate the terms of FERPA. The school board then appealed this to the Supreme Court of the United States, where it was heard on November 27, 2001, and decided on February 19, 2002.

External links
 

United States education case law
United States Supreme Court cases
United States Supreme Court cases of the Rehnquist Court
2002 in United States case law
2002 in education